Calgary Women's Emergency Shelter (CWES) was established in Calgary in 1974. The Calgary Women's Emergency Shelter has serves individuals who experience domestic abuse. The organization was one of the first not-for-profits in Canada established to provide crisis support for victims of family violence, and prevention programs for the community.

CWES started as part of a grassroots movement to assist abused women. CWES is now a full domestic violence service agency with programs that address crisis treatment, intervention and the prevention of domestic violence. The mission of CWES is to end abuse and violence in the lives of women and their families through empowerment, intervention, advocacy, education, and the mobilization of community resources.

Over 16,500 Calgarians seek support each year through one of the shelters many programs. Counsellors respond to over 11,000 calls on the Family Violence Helpline.

Family Violence Crisis Support programs include: 24 hr Family Violence Helpline, crisis intervention and counselling (both in the shelter and in the community), secure shelter for women (individual and with children), individual and group counselling for up to a year, support accessing resources and services required to be safe, and counselling/therapy for children/youth. Prevention Programs: Men's Counselling Service provides counselling for abusive men, violence reduction programs for high school students and older women living in abusive relationships, court program and education programs for work places and Calgarians.

CWES is funded in part by Calgary and Area CFSA , the United Way of Canada, Family and Community Support Services (FCSS) , the city of Calgary, and Alberta Mental Health Board .  CWES also receives funding from individual and corporate donors. Money is distributed to cover educational costs, counseling, and extracurricular activities.

History
1973 The "Oasis" - a concept becomes a reality.
1974  The Calgary Women's Emergency Shelter becomes a registered charity and moves to a new building. 
1978  Appeal for private funds. Services for children developed.
1980  Need for second stage shelter established. Discovery House opens.
1983 Need for second crisis shelter established. Sheriff King Home opens.
1986 The Calgary Women's Emergency Shelter moves to a new facility.  
1987 Funding crisis and threat to close Shelter beds.
1990 Mayor's Task Force on Family and Community Violence. Outreach Services begin.
1991 Beginning of Men's Crisis Services. 
1993 Start of Prevention Project in schools: Non Abusive Futures project.
1994 Shelter faces further funding cuts. First Turning Points Dinner. 
1997 Shelter burns to the ground.
1998 Community shows support. New shelter opens its doors. 
2000 Collaborative Community Crisis Program increases staff. 
2001 Pilot the first dedicated 24 Hour Domestic Violence HelpLine.  
2002 Provincial Governments increases shelter funding.  
2003 Shelter increases bed spaces from 35 to 40.
2009 CWES marks 35 years of serving the community..
2014 CWES marks 40 years of serving the community
2017 CWES has served more than 200,000 individuals to date

External links

References 

Women's organizations based in Canada
Organizations based in Calgary
Women in Calgary